Brittany Mae O'Brien (born 27 May 1998) is an Australian diver. She competed at the 2016 Rio Summer Olympics. She attended Pymble Ladies' College and graduated in 2016. She also owns a Jewellery Brand called Draco Jewellery which she launched in 2020.

Career 
O'Brien is a 10m platform diver. She currently trains at Sydney Olympic Aquatic Centre. Brittany was unable to qualify for the 2016 Rio Summer Olympics after placing third in the 10m platform event at the Australian Diving Championships. Brittany unexpectedly received a late call up on 30 July 2016 to compete in the 2016 Summer Olympics after Brittany Broben was forced to pull out of the event due to a shoulder injury. The result for the Rio 2016 Olympic Games had Brittany qualify for the semi-finals of the women's 10m platform and come overall 15th in the event.

She competed at the Commonwealth Games in 2018 where she came 7th in the women's 10 metre platform event and in 2022 where she won a silver medal in the women's 1 metre springboard, came 5th in the women's synchronised 3 metre springboard event alongside Esther Qin and came 9th in the women's 3 metre springboard event.

See also
 Diving at the 2016 Summer Olympics – Women's 10 metre platform
 Australia at the 2016 Summer Olympics

References

1998 births
Living people
Place of birth missing (living people)
Australian female divers
Divers at the 2016 Summer Olympics
Divers at the 2018 Commonwealth Games
Divers at the 2022 Commonwealth Games
Olympic divers of Australia
Universiade medalists in diving
People educated at Pymble Ladies' College
Universiade silver medalists for Australia
Medalists at the 2017 Summer Universiade
Commonwealth Games medallists in diving
Commonwealth Games silver medallists for Australia
20th-century Australian women
21st-century Australian women
Medallists at the 2022 Commonwealth Games